Idu (이두, hanja : , meaning official's reading) is an archaic writing system that represents the Korean language using hanja. The script, which was developed by  Buddhist monks, made it possible to record Korean words through its equivalent meaning or sound in Chinese. 

The term "idu" may refer to various systems of representing Korean phonology through Chinese characters called hanja, which were used from the early Three Kingdoms to Joseon periods. In this sense, it includes hyangchal, the local writing system used to write vernacular poetry and gugyeol writing. Its narrow sense only refers to the "idu" proper or the system developed in the Goryeo period (918–1392), and first referred to by name in the Jewang Ungi.

Background 
The idu script was developed to record Korean expressions using Chinese graphs borrowed in their Chinese meaning but it was read as the corresponding Korean sounds or by means of Chinese graphs borrowed in their Chinese sounds. This is also known as hanja and was used along with special symbols to indicate indigenous Korean morphemes, verb endings and other grammatical markers that were different in Korean from Chinese. This made both the meaning and pronunciation difficult to parse, and was one reason the system was gradually abandoned, to be replaced with hangul, after its invention in the 15th century. In this respect, it faced problems analogous to those that confronted early efforts to represent the Japanese language with kanji, due to grammatical differences between these languages and Chinese. In Japan, the early use of Chinese characters for Japanese grammar was in man'yōgana, which was replaced by kana, the Japanese syllabic script.

Characters were selected for idu based on their Korean sound, their adapted Korean sound, or their meaning, and some were given a completely new sound and meaning. At the same time, 150 new Korean characters were invented, mainly for names of people and places. Idu system was used mainly by members of the Jungin class.

One of the primary purposes of the script was the clarification of Chinese government documents that were written in Chinese so that they can be understood by the Korean readers. Idu was also used to teach Koreans the Chinese language. The Ming legal code was translated in its entirety into Korean using idu in 1395. The same script was also used to translate the Essentials of agriculture and sericulture (Nongsan jiyao) after it was ordered by the King Taejong in 1414.

See also
 Korean language
 Hunmin Jeongeum
 Kanbun
 Man'yōgana

References

 
 

Korean writing system
Syllabary writing systems